Celaenorrhinus aureus is a species of butterfly in the family Hesperiidae. It is found in the Republic of the Congo.

References

Endemic fauna of the Republic of the Congo
Butterflies described in 2005
aureus